This is a list of all genera, species and subspecies of the family Atractaspididae, otherwise referred to as African burrowing asps, stiletto snakes, or atractaspidids. It follows the taxonomy currently provided by ITIS, which is based on the continuing work of Dr. Roy McDiarmid.

 Amblyodipsas
 Amblyodipsas concolor
 Amblyodipsas dimidiata
 Amblyodipsas katangensis
 Amblyodipsas katangensis ionidesi
 Amblyodipsas katangensis katangensis
 Amblyodipsas microphthalma
 Amblyodipsas polylepis
 Amblyodipsas polylepis hildebrandtii
 Amblyodipsas polylepis polylepis
 Amblyodipsas rodhaini
 Amblyodipsas teitana
 Amblyodipsas unicolor
 Amblyodipsas ventrimaculata
 Aparallactus
 Aparallactus capensis
 Aparallactus capensis bocagii
 Aparallactus capensis capensis
 Aparallactus capensis luebberti
 Aparallactus capensis punctatolineatus
 Aparallactus guentheri
 Aparallactus jacksonii
 Aparallactus lineatus
 Aparallactus lunulatus
 Aparallactus lunulatus lunulatus
 Aparallactus lunulatus nigrocollaris
 Aparallactus lunulatus scortecci
 Aparallactus modestus
 Aparallactus modestus modestus
 Aparallactus modestus ubangensis
 Aparallactus moeruensis
 Aparallactus niger
 Aparallactus nigriceps
 Aparallactus turneri
 Aparallactus werneri
 Atractaspis, Stiletto snakes
 Atractaspis aterrima, Slender burrowing asp
 Atractaspis battersbyi, Battersby's burrowing asp
 Atractaspis bibronii, Bibron's burrowing asp
 Atractaspis boulengeri, Central African burrowing asp
 Atractaspis boulengeri boulengeri
 Atractaspis boulengeri matschiensis
 Atractaspis boulengeri mixta
 Atractaspis boulengeri schmidti
 Atractaspis boulengeri schultzei
 Atractaspis boulengeri vanderborghti
 Atractaspis coalescens, Black burrowing asp
 Atractaspis congica, Congo burrowing asp
 Atractaspis congica congica
 Atractaspis congica leleupi
 Atractaspis congica orientalis
 Atractaspis corpulenta, Fat burrowing asp
 Atractaspis corpulenta corpulenta
 Atractaspis corpulenta kivuensis
 Atractaspis corpulenta leucura
 Atractaspis dahomeyensis, Dahomey burrowing asp
 Atractaspis duerdeni, Duerden's burrowing asp
 Atractaspis engdahli, Engdahl's burrowing asp
 Atractaspis irregularis, Variable burrowing asp
 Atractaspis irregularis angeli
 Atractaspis irregularis bipostocularis
 Atractaspis irregularis irregularis
 Atractaspis irregularis parkeri
 Atractaspis irregularis uelensis
 Atractaspis leucomelas, Ogaden burrowing asp
 Atractaspis microlepidota, Small-scaled burring asp
 Atractaspis microlepidota andersonii
 Atractaspis microlepidota microlepidota
 Atractaspis reticulata, Reticulate burrowing asp
 Atractaspis reticulata brieni
 Atractaspis reticulata heterochilus
 Atractaspis reticulata reticulata
 Atractaspis scorteccii, Somali burrowing asp
 Brachyophis
 Brachyophis revoili
 Brachyophis revoili cornii
 Brachyophis revoili krameri
 Brachyophis revoili revoili
 Chilorhinophis
 Chilorhinophis butleri
 Chilorhinophis carpenteri
 Chilorhinophis carpenteri carpenteri
 Chilorhinophis carpenteri liwalensis
 Chilorhinophis gerardi
 Chilorhinophis gerardi gerardi
 Chilorhinophis gerardi tanganyikae
 Elapotinus, Jan's snake
 Elapotinus picteti, Jan's snake
 Hypoptophis
 Hypoptophis wilsoni
 Macrelaps
 Macrelaps microlepidotus
 Micrelaps
 Micrelaps bicoloratus, Kenya two-headed snake
 Micrelaps bicoloratus bicoloratus
 Micrelaps bicoloratus moyeri
 Micrelaps muelleri, Muller's snake
 Micrelaps vaillanti, Somali two-headed snake
 Poecilopholis
 Poecilopholis cameronensis
 Polemon
 Polemon acanthias
 Polemon barthii
 Polemon bocourti
 Polemon christyi
 Polemon collaris
 Polemon collaris brevior
 Polemon collaris collaris
 Polemon collaris longior
 Polemon fulvicollis
 Polemon fulvicollis fulvicollis
 Polemon fulvicollis gracilis
 Polemon fulvicollis graveri
 Polemon fulvicollis laurenti
 Polemon gabonensis
 Polemon gabonensis gabonensis
 Polemon gabonensis schmidti
 Polemon gracilis
 Polemon griseiceps
 Polemon leopoldi
 Polemon neuwiedi
 Polemon notatus
 Polemon notatus aemulans
 Polemon notatus notatus
 Polemon robustus
 Xenocalamus
 Xenocalamus bicolor
 Xenocalamus bicolor australis
 Xenocalamus bicolor bicolor
 Xenocalamus bicolor concavorostralis
 Xenocalamus bicolor lineatus
 Xenocalamus bicolor machadoi
 Xenocalamus bicolor maculatus
 Xenocalamus mechowii
 Xenocalamus mechowii inornatus
 Xenocalamus mechowii mechowii
 Xenocalamus michelli
 Xenocalamus sabiensis
 Xenocalamus transvaalensis, Transvaal quillsnout snake

References

 
Atractaspididae
Atractaspididae